The 2010 NASCAR Camping World Truck Series was the sixteenth season of the third highest stock car racing series in the United States. Beginning at Daytona International Speedway, the season included twenty-five races, which ended with the Ford 200 at Homestead-Miami Speedway. During the 2009 off season, NASCAR announced few calendar changes, returning to Darlington Raceway for the first time in six years. Kyle Busch Motorsports won the owners' championship in their inaugural season, while Todd Bodine won the drivers' championship during the Lucas Oil 150 at Phoenix International Raceway, one race before the final. Toyota won the manufacturers' championship with 193 points.

2010 teams and drivers

Complete schedule

Notes:
 Cobb's team purchased the equipment and owner points from the Circle Bar Racing No. 10 truck.
 Kyle Busch purchased the assets of Xpress Motorsports and used their owner points from 2009 (from the No. 16 truck).
 RCR purchased the No. 48 Fast Track truck's owner points from 2009 for the No. 3 truck.
 Rick Ware Racing purchased the owner points from the former No. 08 SS-Green Light truck for the No. 47 truck.
 Carmichael's No. 4 team purchased the owner points from the championship-winning No. 33 Kevin Harvick, Inc. truck in 2009.

Part-time schedule

Schedule
The season marked the return of Darlington Raceway to the schedule for the first time since 2004, replacing the Milwaukee Mile. The series also raced for the first time at Pocono Raceway. After the closing of Memphis Motorsports Park, a second race was added to Nashville Superspeedway on the first of two weekends where the Nationwide and Truck Series raced but the Cup Series had off weekends. Kentucky Speedway's stand-alone date on the July Cup Series off weekend was moved to the Friday night of Labor Day weekend in September, the same weekend that the IndyCar Series had a race there.

All 25 Truck races were aired on TV on Speed, with all of them being broadcast live except for the race at Dover, which was aired on tape delay by three hours (at 8 p.m.) after the race started at 5 p.m. (noted below with an * asterisk). Unlike the Cup and Nationwide Series Motor Racing Network had the radio coverage for all races.

Results and standings

Races

Full Drivers' Championship

(key) Bold – Pole position awarded by time. Italics – Pole position set by owner's points. * – Most laps led.

Manufacturers

Rookie of the Year
The top 4

See also

2010 NASCAR Sprint Cup Series
2010 NASCAR Nationwide Series
2010 NASCAR Corona Series
2010 NASCAR Mini Stock Series
2010 NASCAR Canadian Tire Series

References

External links 
Truck Series Standings and Statistics for 2010

NASCAR Truck Series seasons